The 1999 AT&T Challenge was a men's tennis tournament played on Clay in Atlanta, United States that was part of the World Series of the 1999 ATP Tour. It was the fourteenth edition of the tournament and was held from 26 April – 2 May 1999.

Seeds
Champion seeds are indicated in bold text while text in italics indicates the round in which those seeds were eliminated.

Draw

Finals

Top half

Bottom half

References

External links
 Main draw

1999 ATP Tour
1999 Singles